Elections were held in Illinois on Tuesday, November 7, 1978.

Primaries were held on March 21, 1978.

This was the first election that the 1970 Constitution of Illinois' change took effect that all statewide executive offices would be elected in national midterm years.

Election information
1978 was a midterm election year in the United States.

This was the first election that the 1970 Constitution of Illinois' change took effect that all statewide executive offices would be elected in national midterm years. To accommodate this, in 1976, all statewide executive offices that were up for election were elected to two-year terms that would expire following the 1978 elections.

Turnout
Turnout in the primary election was 25.14%, with a total of 1,482,034 ballots cast. 911,290 Democratic and 570,744 Republican primary ballots were cast.

Turnout during the general election was 57.55%, with 3,342,985 ballots cast.

Federal elections

United States Senate

Incumbent Republican Charles H. Percy was reelected to a third term.

United States House 

All 24 Illinois seats in the United States House of Representatives were up for election in 1978. The Republican Party flipped one seat, leaving the composition of Illinois' House delegation to consist of 13 Republicans and 11 democrats.

State elections

Governor and Lieutenant Governor

Incumbent Governor James R. Thompson and Lieutenant Governor David C. O'Neal, Republicans, jointly won reelection to a second term.

Attorney General 

Incumbent Attorney General William J. Scott, a Republican, was elected to a fourth term.

Democratic primary
Richard J. Troy, a Commissioner of the Metropolitan Water Reclamation District of Greater Chicago, won the Democratic primary, running unopposed.

Republican primary
Incumbent William J. Scott won the Republican primary, running unopposed.

General election

Secretary of State 

Incumbent Secretary of State Alan J. Dixon, a Democrat, was reelected to a second term.

Dixon's margin-of victory was considered to be a landslide.

Democratic primary
Incumbent Alan J. Dixon won the Democratic primary, running unopposed.

Republican primary
Elk Grove Township Clerk Sharon Sharp won the Republican primary, running unopposed.

General election

Comptroller 

Incumbent Comptroller Michael Bakalis, a Democrat, did not seek a second term, instead opting to run for governor. Democrat Roland Burris was elected to succeed him. In winning the election, Burris became the first American American to be elected to statewide office in Illinois.

Democratic primary
With more than 64% of the vote, Roland Burris defeated State Representative Richard Luft in the Democratic primary.

Burris was a Chicago attorney that had formerly served as director of the Department of General Services under Governor Dan Walker. Luft had been the early favorite for the party to slate, but at the last minute was beaten out by Burris when the party finally slated candidates. It was reported that black Chicago Democrats had pressured the party to slate a black candidate for statewide office.

During the campaign, Burris and Luft argued over Burris' record as director of the Department of General Services.

Republican primary
With more than 52% of the vote, John W. Castle, director of the Department of Local Government Affairs, defeated  W. Robert Blair, former Speaker of the Illinois House of Representatives, in the Republican primary. Governor James R. Thompson, who had convinced Castle to abandon his declared plans to run for treasurer and instead run for comptroller, publicly endorsed Castle. Blair criticized Castle for this endorsement, alleging that he would not be able to operate the comptroller's office independently of the governor, while Castle denied that his decisions would be influenced by his political ties to Thompson.

General election

Treasurer 

Incumbent Treasurer was Donald R. Smith, a Republican who had been appointed in 1977, did not seek reelection. Democrat Jerome Cosentino was elected to succeed him in office. This election made Cosentino the first Italian-American to be elected to statewide office in Illinois.

Democratic primary
In the Democratic primary, the party establishment had slated Metropolitan Water Reclamation District of Greater Chicago commissioner Jerome Cosentino as its preferred candidate. He won the primary with 60% of the vote, defeating Nina T. Shepherd, a trustee of the University of Illinois. Shepherd received the endorsement of Independent Voter of Illinois in the primary. She ran largely due to the failure of the party of slate a woman for any statewide office. The primary was not overly heated. One issue that haunted Cosentino was that his trucking firm was under investigation by the Interstate Commerce Commission for possible violations of the Interstate Commerce Act. While the investigation found no evidence of wrongdoing, it was not completed until after the primary was over.

Republican primary
James M. Skelton won a narrow 52% victory over Bradley M. Glass in the Republican primary. With Skelton being a downstate politician, and Glass being an upstate politician, the race had the dynamics of "downstate vs. upstate". John W. Castle had originally announced that he would run for the Republican nomination for Treasurer, before being convinced by Governor James R. Thompson to instead run for comptroller.

General election

State Senate
One-third of the seats of the Illinois Senate were up for election in 1982. Democrats retained control of the chamber.

State House of Representatives
All of the seats in the Illinois House of Representatives were up for election in 1978. Democrats retained control of the chamber.

Trustees of University of Illinois

An election was held for three of nine seats for Trustees of University of Illinois system. 

The election saw the reelection incumbent second-term Republican Ralph Crane Hahn and the election of new members, Democrats Edmund Roche Donoghue and Paul Stone.

Incumbent Republican Park Livingston and incumbent first-term Republican Jane Hayes Rader lost reelection.

Judicial elections
Multiple judicial positions were up for election in 1978.

Ballot measures
Illinois voters voted on a two legislatively referred constitutional amendment ballot measures in 1978. In order to be approved, the measures required either 60% support among those specifically voting on the measure or 50% support among all ballots cast in the elections.

Personal Property Tax Amendment
The Personal Property Tax Amendment (also known as "Amendment 1") was a legislatively referred constitutional amendment which would have amended Article IX, Section 5 of the Constitution of Illinois to eliminate the provision that required the legislature to abolish the personal property tax by January 1, 1979. It failed to meet either threshold to amend the constitution.

Exempt Veterans' Organizations from Property Taxes Amendment 
The Exempt Veterans' Organizations from Property Taxes Amendment (also known as "Property Tax Exemption for Veterans' Organizations Amendment" and "Amendment 2") was a legislatively referred constitutional amendment which would have amended Article IX, Section 6 of the Constitution of Illinois to exempt veterans' associations from paying property taxes on their meeting halls. It failed to meet either threshold to amend the constitution.

Local elections
Local elections were held.

References

 
Illinois